The Warren Ferris House is a historic home located in Springfield Center, New York. It was built in 1894 by Warren Ferris. It is a two and one-half story tall wood-framed building on a cut-stone foundation, in the Queen Anne style. The building is characterized by irregular massing, as it is divided into four distinct sections, decreasing in size from front to rear. There is also a contemporary carriage house also constructed in 1894.

It was added to the National Register of Historic Places in 2016.

References

Buildings and structures in Otsego County, New York
National Register of Historic Places in Otsego County, New York
Houses on the National Register of Historic Places in New York (state)